Limestone is a town in Aroostook County, Maine, United States. The population was 1,526 at the 2020 census.

The town is best known for being the home of the Loring Commerce Centre (formerly Loring Air Force Base; also lying on its former territory is the Aroostook National Wildlife Refuge) and Maine School of Science and Mathematics (MSSM), which in 2019 ranked #2 in the United States by U.S. News & World Report.

The population center of the town is in Limestone (CDP), in the east-central part of the town.

History
Limestone was incorporated as a town on March 17, 1869, and was named for regional limestone deposits.

General Mark Trafton
General Mark Trafton is known as one of the founders of the town of Limestone. Trafton was born July 4, 1785, in York County, Maine. He was educated in public schools and became a leading citizen in Bangor, prominent in civil and military affairs.  When a young man, he was commissioned captain of cavalry and served in the War of 1812.  He was afterward brigadier-general of the state militia.  He was a land agent for the eastern and northern sections of Maine before the office was opened in Bangor.

Geography

Climate
This climatic region is typified by large seasonal temperature differences, with warm to hot (and often humid) summers and cold (sometimes severely cold) winters. According to the Köppen Climate Classification system, Limestone has a humid continental climate, abbreviated "Dfb" on climate maps.

Demographics

2010 census
As of the census of 2010, there were 2,314 people, 809 households, and 489 families living in the town. The racial makeup of the town was 89.2% White, 7.0% African American, 1.3% Native American, 0.7% Asian, 0.4% from other races, and 1.4% from two or more races. Hispanic or Latino of any race were 3.8% of the population.

There were 809 households, of which 24.7% had children under the age of 18 living with them, 45.5% were married couples living together, 10.0% had a female householder with no husband present, 4.9% had a male householder with no wife present, and 39.6% were non-families. 32.5% of all households were made up of individuals, and 12.6% had someone living alone who was 65 years of age or older. The average household size was 2.21 and the average family size was 2.74.

The median age in the town was 34.7 years. 22% of residents were under the age of 18; 20.1% were between the ages of 18 and 24; 18.3% were from 25 to 44; 24.6% were from 45 to 64; and 15.1% were 65 years of age or older. The gender makeup of the town was 53.5% male and 46.5% female.

2000 census

At the 2000 census, there were 2,361 people, 801 households and 527 families living in the town. The racial makeup of the town was 90.05% White, 5.08% Black or African American, 0.72% Native American, 1.40% Asian, 0.04% Pacific Islander, 1.06% from other races, and 1.65% from two or more races. Hispanic or Latino of any race were 4.24% of the population.

There were 801 households, of which 28.3% had children under the age of 18 living with them, 52.7% were married couples living together, 9.0% had a female householder with no husband present, and 34.2% were non-families. 30.7% of all households were made up of individuals, and 11.9% had someone living alone who was 65 years of age or older. The average household size was 2.32 and the average family size was 2.86.

Age distribution was 25.7% under the age of 18, 18.0% from 18 to 24, 22.1% from 25 to 44, 22.1% from 45 to 64, and 12.2% who were 65 years of age or older. The median age was 31 years. For every 100 females, there were 112.5 males. For every 100 females age 18 and over, there were 109.9 males.

The median household income was $35,313, and the median family income was $39,135. Males had a median income of $30,579 versus $18,400 for females. The per capita income for the town was $13,502. About 7.7% of families and 20.1% of the population were below the poverty line, including 15.9% of those under age 18 and 12.4% of those age 65 or over.

Economy

Military 
Limestone was home to the former Loring Air Force Base. The base closed in 1994, after which it became known as the site of three large festivals by the Vermont jam band Phish. Tens of thousands of Phish fans poured into the site to temporarily make Limestone the most populous town in Maine during individual weekends of the summers of 1997 (The Great Went), 1998 (Lemonwheel) and 2003 (It).

It is now the Loring Commerce Centre, one of Maine's largest industrial parks.

Attractions
Limestone is home to the Aroostook National Wildlife Refuge.

Education
The town is also home to the Maine School of Science and Mathematics, a residential magnet high school specializing in math and science education, once ranked #2 in the United States. Limestone is also home to the Loring Job Corps Center, located on part of the old Loring Air Force Base.

Notable people

 Steve Bartalo, American football player
 Conrad Keefe Cyr, federal appellate judge

References

External links
Town of Limestone official website
The Maine School of Science and Mathematics

 
Towns in Aroostook County, Maine
Towns in Maine